WUSB may refer to:

 Wireless USB, a wireless extension to USB
 WUSB (FM), Stony Brook University's radio station (90.1 FM)
 World Union of Saint Bernards : An association of Breed Clubs for the St. Bernard (dog) breed.